Euchromius subcambridgei is a moth in the family Crambidae. It was described by Stanisław Błeszyński in 1965. It is found in Tunisia and Sudan.

References

Crambinae
Moths described in 1965
Moths of Africa